A narrow-gauge railway (narrow-gauge railroad in the US) is a railway with a track gauge narrower than standard .

Since narrow-gauge railways are usually built with tighter curves, smaller structure gauges, and lighter rails, they can be less costly to build, equip, and operate than standard- or broad-gauge railways (particularly in mountainous or difficult terrain). Lower-cost narrow-gauge railways are often used in mountainous terrain, where engineering savings can be substantial. Lower-cost narrow-gauge railways are often built to serve industries as well as sparsely populated communities where the traffic potential would not justify the cost of a standard- or broad-gauge line. Narrow-gauge railways have specialised use in mines and other environments where a small structure gauge necessitates a small loading gauge.

In some countries, narrow gauge is the standard; Japan, Indonesia, Taiwan, New Zealand, South Africa, and the Australian states of Queensland, Western Australia and Tasmania have a  gauge, whereas Vietnam, Malaysia and Thailand have metre-gauge railways. Narrow-gauge trams, particularly metre-gauge, are common in Europe. Non-industrial, narrow-gauge mountain railways are (or were) common in the Rocky Mountains of the United States and the Pacific Cordillera of Canada, Mexico, Switzerland, Bulgaria, the former Yugoslavia, Greece, and Costa Rica.

Nomenclature

Historically, the term was sometimes used to refer to standard-gauge railways, to distinguish them from broad-gauge railways, but this use no longer applies.

History

Early hand-worked lines 

The earliest recorded railway appears in Georgius Agricola's 1556 De re metallica, which shows a mine in Bohemia with a railway of about  gauge. During the 16th century, railways were primarily restricted to hand-pushed, narrow-gauge lines in mines throughout Europe. In the 17th century, mine railways were extended to provide transportation above ground. These lines were industrial, connecting mines with nearby transportation points (usually canals or other waterways). These railways were usually built to the same narrow gauge as the mine railways from which they developed.

Introduction of steam 
The world's first steam locomotive, built in 1802 by Richard Trevithick for the Coalbrookdale Company, ran on a  plateway. The first commercially successful steam locomotive was Matthew Murray's Salamanca built in 1812 for the  Middleton Railway in Leeds. Salamanca was also the first rack-and-pinion locomotive. During the 1820s and 1830s, a number of industrial narrow-gauge railways in the United Kingdom used steam locomotives. In 1842, the first narrow-gauge steam locomotive outside the UK was built for the -gauge Antwerp-Ghent Railway in Belgium. The first use of steam locomotives on a public, passenger-carrying narrow-gauge railway was in 1865, when the Ffestiniog Railway introduced passenger service after receiving its first locomotives two years earlier.

Industrial use 
Many narrow-gauge railways were part of industrial enterprises and served primarily as industrial railways, rather than general carriers. Common uses for these industrial narrow-gauge railways included mining, logging, construction, tunnelling, quarrying, and conveying agricultural products. Extensive narrow-gauge networks were constructed in many parts of the world; 19th-century mountain logging operations often used narrow-gauge railways to transport logs from mill to market. Significant sugarcane railways still operate in Cuba, Fiji, Java, the Philippines, and Queensland, and narrow-gauge railway equipment remains in common use for building tunnels.

Introduction of internal combustion 

In 1897, a manganese mine in the Lahn valley in Germany was using two benzine-fueled locomotives with single cylinder internal combustion engines on the 500mm gauge tracks of their mine railway; these locomotives were made by the Deutz Gas Engine Company (Gasmotorenfabrik Deutz), now Deutz AG. Another early use of internal combustion was to power a narrow-gauge locomotive was in 1902. F. C. Blake built a 7 hp petrol locomotive for the Richmond Main Sewerage Board sewage plant at Mortlake. This  gauge locomotive was probably the third petrol-engined locomotive built.

First World War and later 
Extensive narrow-gauge rail systems served the front-line trenches of both sides in World War I. They were a short-lived military application, and after the war the surplus equipment created a small boom in European narrow-gauge railway building.

Improvements

Heavy-duty tracks

The heavy-duty  narrow-gauge railways in Australia (Queensland), New Zealand, South Africa, Japan, Taiwan, Indonesia and the Philippines demonstrate that if track is built to a heavy-duty standard, performance almost as good as a standard-gauge line is possible.

Two-hundred-car trains operate on the Sishen–Saldanha railway line in South Africa, and high-speed Tilt Trains run in Queensland. In South Africa and New Zealand, the loading gauge is similar to the restricted British loading gauge; in New Zealand, some British Rail Mark 2 carriages have been rebuilt with new bogies for use by Tranz Scenic (Wellington-Palmerston North service), Tranz Metro (Wellington-Masterton service), and Auckland One Rail (Auckland suburban services).

Another example of a heavy-duty narrow-gauge line is Brazil's EFVM.  gauge, it has over-100-pound rail and a loading gauge almost as large as US non-excess-height lines. The line has a number of  locomotives and 200-plus-car trains.

Fastest trains
Narrow gauge's reduced stability means that its trains cannot run at speeds as high as on broader gauges.

In Japan and Queensland, recent permanent-way improvements have allowed trains on  gauge tracks to exceed .

Curve radius is also important for high speeds: narrow-gauge railways allow sharper curves, but these limit a vehicle's safe speed.

Gauges

Many narrow gauges, from  gauge and  gauge, are in present or former use. They fall into several broad categories:

Just under standard gauge

Huddersfield Corporation Tramways
 Glasgow Corporation Tramways

4 ft 6 in gauge

 track gauge (also known as Scotch gauge) was adopted by early 19th-century railways, primarily in the Lanarkshire area of Scotland.  lines were also constructed, and both were eventually converted to standard gauge.

Around 4 ft gauge

Middleton Railway

Barrow-in-Furness Tramways Company
 Bradford Corporation Tramways
 City of Oxford Tramways Company
 Darwen Corporation Tramways
 Derby Tramways Company
 Falkirk and District Tramways
 Glasgow Subway
 Honolulu Rapid Transit and Land Company
 Keighley Tramways
 Padarn Railway
 Reading Corporation Tramways
 Redruth and Chasewater Railway
 Saundersfoot Railway
 Wellington tramway system

Central Funicular
 Fribourg funicular
 Gardena Ronda Express
 Rheineck–Walzenhausen mountain railway, Appenzell Railways
 Schlossbergbahn (Freiburg)
 Stoosbahn
 Zagreb Funicular

Arcata and Mad River Railroad
Northern Redwood Lumber Company

Middlebere Plateway

1093 mm gauge 
 Köping–Uttersberg–Riddarhyttan Railway

3 ft 6 in gauge

Similar gauges
  in Algeria
  on the Hejaz railway in Israel, Jordan, Lebanon, Saudi Arabia and Syria; only a few lines survive.

Metre gauge and Italian metre gauge

According to Italian law, track gauges in Italy were defined from the centre of each rail rather than the inside edges of the rails. This gauge, measured  between the edges of the rails, is known as Italian metre gauge.

3 ft, 900 mm, and Swedish three-foot gauge

There were a number of large  railroad systems in North America; notable examples include the Denver & Rio Grande and Rio Grande Southern in Colorado and the South Pacific Coast, White Pass and Yukon Route and West Side Lumber Co of California.  was also a common track gauge in South America, Ireland and on the Isle of Man.  was a common gauge in Europe. Swedish three-foot-gauge railways are unique to that country.

2 ft 9 in gauge 
A few railways and tramways were built to  gauge, including Nankai Main Line (later converted to ), Ocean Pier Railway at Atlantic City, Seaton Tramway (converted from ) and Waiorongomai Tramway.

800 mm, 2 ft 6 in, Bosnian and 750 mm gauge

 gauge railways are commonly used for rack railways. Imperial  gauge railways were generally constructed in the former British colonies.  Bosnian gauge and  railways are predominantly found in Russia and Eastern Europe.

Between  and  gauge 

2 ft and 600 mm gauges

 gauge railways were generally constructed in the former British colonies.

Minimum gauge

Gauges below  were rare. Several  gauge railways were built in Britain to serve ammunition depots and other military facilities, particularly during World War I.

See also

 Feldbahn
 Forest railway
 Heeresfeldbahn
 Industrial railway
 List of track gauges
 List of tram systems by gauge and electrification
 Military railways
 Minimum-gauge railway
 Narrow-gauge railway modelling
 Narrow-gauge railways in the Netherlands
 Narrow-gauge railways in Sweden
 Narrow-gauge railways in Europe
 Rail transport in Walt Disney Parks and Resorts
 Ridable miniature railway
 Track gauge
 Trench railways
 War Department Light Railways

References

Notes

 "Trade House" Kambarka Engineering Works "
 P. Whitehouse, J. Snell. Narrow Gauge Railways of the British Isles, David & Charles, 1994, ISBN C-7153-0196-9
 Railroads of Colorado: Your Guide to Colorado's Historic Trains and Railway Sites, Claude Wiatrowski, Voyageur Press, 2002, hardcover, 160 pages, 
 Keith Chester. "East European Narrow Gauge" 1995
 "Narrow Gauge Through the Bush – Ontario's Toronto Grey and Bruce and Toronto and Nipissing Railways"; Rod Clarke; pub. Beaumont and Clarke, with the Credit Valley Railway Company, Streetsville, Ontario, 2007. 
 "The Narrow Gauge For Us – The Story of the Toronto and Nipissing Railway"; Charles Cooper; pub. The Boston Mills Press; Erin, Ontario, 1982.
 "Narrow Gauge Railways of Canada"; Omer Lavallee; pub. Railfair, Montreal, 1972.
 "Narrow Gauge Railways of Canada"; Omer Lavallee, expanded and revised by Ronald S Ritchie; pub. Fitzhenry and Whiteside, Markham, Ontario, 2005.
 "The Toronto Grey and Bruce Railway 1863–1884; Thomas F McIlwraith; pub. Upper Canada Railway Society, Toronto, 1963.
 "Steam Trains to the Bruce"; Ralph Beaumont; pub. The Boston Mills Press; Cheltenham, Ontario, 1977
 "Running Late on the Bruce"; Ralph Beaumont & James Filby; pub The Boston Mills Press, Cheltenham, Ontario, 1980
 Nevada Central Narrow Gauge ; Michael J. Brown

Lists of track gauges
 
Railways by type
Track gauges by size